Fons is a commune in the Lot department in south-western France. The 19th-century French historian, librarian and palaeographer Léon Lacabane (1798–1884) was born in Fons.

See also
Communes of the Lot department

References

Communes of Lot (department)